The Grand Harbour of Malta tornado was a tornado that hit the Grand Harbour of Malta with very intense strength. It began as a waterspout killing at least 600 people. At least four of the Order's galleys, named Santa Fè, San Michele, San Filippo and San Claudio, capsized in the tornado. The date of the tornado is unknown, as sources conflict on it being September 23, 1551 or September 23, 1556. TORRO indicates a rating of T7 on the TORRO scale, equivalent to F3 on the Fujita scale.

See also 
List of tornadoes and tornado outbreaks
List of European tornadoes and tornado outbreaks

References

Tornadoes in Malta
16th-century meteorology
1551 in Europe
1550s in Malta
16th-century natural disasters